is a retired female judoka from Japan. She claimed the bronze medal in the Women's Heavyweight (+ 72 kg) division at the 1992 Summer Olympics in Barcelona, Spain. In the bronze medal match she defeated Poland's Beata Maksymowa.

References
sports-reference

1968 births
Living people
Japanese female judoka
Judoka at the 1992 Summer Olympics
Olympic judoka of Japan
Olympic bronze medalists for Japan
People from Nagasaki
Olympic medalists in judo
Medalists at the 1992 Summer Olympics
20th-century Japanese women
21st-century Japanese women